Please add names of notable painters with a Wikipedia page, in precise English alphabetical order, using U.S. spelling conventions. Country and regional names refer to where painters worked for long periods, not to personal allegiances.

Richard Dadd (1817–1886), English fairy-tale painter
Bernardo Daddi (c. 1280 – 1348), Italian painter
Pascal Dagnan-Bouveret (1852–1929), French naturalist painter
Johan Christian Dahl (1788–1857), Norwegian painter
Michael Dahl (1659–1743), Swedish portrait painter
Helen Dahm (1878–1968), Swiss print-maker and muralist
Dai Jin (戴進, 1388–1462), Chinese Zhe School painter
Dai Xi (戴熙, 1801–1860), Chinese genre painter
Claire Dalby (born 1944), Scottish/English artist, engraver and book illustrator
Roy Dalgarno (1910–2001), Australian painter and art lecturer
Salvador Dalí (1904–1989), Spanish surrealist painter
Christen Dalsgaard (1824–1907), Danish painter
Thomas Aquinas Daly (born 1937), American landscape and still life painter
Dietmar Damerau (1935–2011), German/Greek painter and sculptor
Ken Danby (1940–2007), Canadian artist and medalist
Vito D'Ancona (1825–1884), Italian artist
Josef Dande (1911–1969), Hungarian landscape artist
Leonard Daniels (1909–1998), English artist, teacher and administrator
Heinrich Danioth (1896–1953), Swiss painter
Nassos Daphnis (1914–2010), American painter, sculptor and plant breeder
Fritz von Dardel (1817–1901), Swedish illustrator and caricaturist
Nils von Dardel (1888–1943), Swedish painter
Jacques Daret (1404–1470), Netherlandish painter
William Dargie (1912–2003), Australian portrait painter
Charles-François Daubigny (1817–1878), French painter of the Barbizon school
Honoré Daumier (1808–1879), French print-maker, caricaturist, painter and sculptor
Max Dauthendey (1867–1918), German painter and author
Gerard David (ca.1450–1523), Netherlandish painter and manuscript illuminator
Jacques-Louis David (1748–1825), French Neoclassical painter
Mary C. Davidson (1865–1951), Scottish landscape painter
Ivor Davies (born 1935), Welsh painter and mosaic artist
Charles Harold Davis (1856–1933), American landscape painter
Eleanor Layfield Davis (1911–1985), American painter and sculptor
Mary Davis, Lady Davis (1866–1941), designer and painter of fans
Heinrich Maria Davringhausen (1894–1970), German painter
Gladys Dawson (1909–1993), English painter
Janet Dawson (born 1935), Australian painter
Gene Davis (1920–1985), American color-field painter
Ronald Davis (born 1937), American painter
Stuart Davis (1892–1964), American modernist painter
Adrienn Henczné Deák (1890–1956), Hungarian painter
Édouard Debat-Ponsan (1847–1913), French academic painter
Alison Debenham (1903–1967), English painter 
Jean Baptiste Debret (1768–1848), French painter and lithographer
Joseph DeCamp (1858–1923), American painter and educator
Michel De Caso (born 1956), French visual artist
Ettore "Ted" DeGrazia (1909–1982), American painter, sculptor, lithographer and composer
Raoul De Keyser (1930–2012), Belgian painter
Eric de Kolb (1916–2001), Austrian/American painter, sculptor and designer
Roy De Maistre (1894–1968), Australian artist
Giuseppe De Nittis (1846–1884), Italian painter
Edgar Degas (1834–1917), French painter, sculptor, print-maker and draftsman
Eugène Delacroix (1798–1863), French painter and muralist
Michel Delacroix (born 1933), French naïve painter
Beauford Delaney (1901–1979), American modernist painter
Joseph Delaney (1904–1991), American artist
Robert Delaunay (1885–1941), French Orphist artist
Sonia Delaunay-Terk (1885–1979), French Orphist artist
Dirck van Delen (1605–1671), Dutch architectural painter
Willem Jacobsz Delff (1580–1638), Dutch engraver and painter
Santiago Martínez Delgado (1906–1964), Colombian painter, sculptor and writer
Paul Delvaux (1897–1994), Belgian painter
Jenny Eakin Delony (1866–1949), American painter and educator
Richard Demarco (born 1930), Scottish artist and promoter
Grillo Demo (fl. 1978 onwards), Argentine/Spanish artist
Charles Demuth (1883–1935), American water-colorist and oil painter
Valéria Dénes (1877–1915), Hungarian painter
Maurice Denis (1870–1943), French painter, decorative artist and writer
Roger Wilson Dennis (1902–1966), American painter
Christabel Dennison (1884–1924), English painter and sculptor
André Derain (1880–1954), French painter and sculptor
Brigid Derham (1943–1980), English abstract painter
Gyula Derkovits (1894–1934), Hungarian painter and graphic artist
Martin Desjardins (1637–1694), Belgian/French sculptor and stuccoist
Paul Lucien Dessau (1909–1999), English painter and musician
Yehia Dessouki (born 1978), Egyptian painter and visual artist
Édouard Detaille (1847–1912), French painter and military artist
Claudio Detto (born 1950), Italian contemporary art painter
Serafino De Tivoli (1826–1892), Italian artist
Anthony Devas (1911–1958), English portrait painter
Giorgio De Vincenzi (1884–1965), Italian painter and etcher
Thomas Dewing (1851–1938), American tonalist painter
Alexander Deyneka (1899–1969), Soviet painter, graphic artist and sculptor
David Diao (born 1943) American artist and teacher
Emiliano Di Cavalcanti (1897–1976), Brazilian painter
Jessie Alexandra Dick (1896–1976), Scottish painter
Robert Dickerson (1929–2015), Australian figurative painter
Edwin Dickinson (1891–1978), American painter and draftsman
Porfirio DiDonna (1942–1986), American artist
Richard Diebenkorn (1922–1993), American painter and print-maker
Pieter Franciscus Dierckx (1871–1950), Belgian impressionist painter
Adolf Dietrich (1877–1957), Swiss naïve artist and laborer
Mary Dignam (1860–1938), Canadian painter and activist
Sam Dillemans (born 1965), Belgian painter
Meredith Dillman, American fantasy artist and illustrator
Silvia Dimitrova (born 1970), Bulgarian icon painter
Jim Dine (born 1935), American pop artist
Ding Guanpeng (丁觀鵬, 1708–1771), Chinese painter
Ding Yunpeng (丁雲鵬, 1547–1628), Chinese painter
Abidin Dino (1913–1993), Turkish artist and painter
Dionisius (c. 1440 – 1502), Russian head of the Moscow icon painters' school
Balázs Diószegi (1914–1999), Hungarian painter
Paul Dirmeikis (born 1954), French-speaking Lithuanian poet, composer, performer and painter 
Eve Disher (1894–1991), English portrait painter
Alén Diviš (1900–1956), Czechoslovak painter of the melancholic
Otto Dix (1891–1969), German painter and print-maker
William Dobell (1899–1970), Australian painter
William Dobson (1610–1646), English portrait painter
Mstislav Dobuzhinsky (1875–1957) Russian/Lithuanian painter and illustrator
Lois Dodd (born 1927), American painter
Isobelle Ann Dods-Withers (1876–1939), Scottish painter
Theo van Doesburg (1883–1931), Dutch painter, writer and architect
Eppo Doeve (1907–1981), Dutch painter and cartoonist
Tommaso Dolabella (1570–1650), Italian/Polish painter
László Dombrovszky (1894–1982), Hungarian painter 
Domenichino (or Domenico Zampieri) (1581–1641), Italian painter
Óscar Domínguez (1906–1957), Spanish surrealist painter
Tadeusz Dominik (born 1928), Polish painter, draftsman and art professor
Inshō Dōmoto (堂本印象, 1891–1975), Japanese nihonga painter
David Donaldson (1916–1996), Scottish royal painter and illuminator
János Donát (1744–1830), Hungarian painter 
Dong Qichang (董其昌, 1555–1636), Chinese painter, calligrapher and art theorist
Dong Yuan (董源, 934–962), Chinese painter
Antonio Donghi (1897–1963), Italian painter
Lambert Doomer (1624–1700), Dutch landscape painter
Gustave Doré (1832–1883), French artist, print-maker and illustrator
Kees van Dongen (1877–1968), Dutch/French painter
Géza Dósa (1846–1871), Hungarian painter 
Dosso Dossi (ca.1490–1542), Italian painter
Gerrit Dou (1613–1675), Dutch painter
Jaroslav Doubrava (1909–1960), Czechoslovak painter, composer and pedagogue
Thomas Doughty (1793–1856), American landscape artist
Aaron Douglas (1898–1979), American painter, illustrator and visual arts educator
William Fettes Douglas (1822–1891), Scottish painter and President of the Royal Scottish Academy
Thomas Millie Dow (1848–1919), Scottish/American painter
Rackstraw Downes (born 1939), English/American realist painter and author
Helen Thomas Dranga (1866–1940), British/American painter
Pamela Drew (1910–1989), English marine and aviation painter
William Dring (1904–1990), English portrait painter
Willem Drost (1633–1659), Dutch painter and print-maker
Orshi Drozdik (born 1946), Hungarian artist and feminist
Malcolm Drummond (1880–1945), English painter and print-maker
Russell Drysdale (1912–1981), Australian artist
Du Jin (杜堇, c. 1465–1509), Chinese painter
Du Qiong (杜瓊, 1396–1474), Chinese painter, calligrapher and poet
Albert Dubois-Pillet (1846–1890) French painter and army officer
Nikolay Nikanorovich Dubovskoy (1859–1918), Russian landscape painter
Mario Dubsky (1939–1985), English artist
Jean Dubuffet (1901–1985), French painter and sculptor
Duccio (1255–1319), Italian painter
Marcel Duchamp (1887–1968), French artist
Raymond Duchamp-Villon (1876–1918), French sculptor
Suzanne Duchamp-Crotti (1889–1963), French painter
Jacob Duck (1600–1667), Dutch painter and etcher
Jack M. Ducker (fl. 1910–1930), European landscape
Jean Dufy (1888–1964), French painter
Raoul Dufy (1877–1953), French painter
Thomas Cantrell Dugdale (1880–1952), English portrait painter and war artist
Edward Dugmore (1915–1996), American painter
Karel Dujardin (1622–1678), Dutch painter
Frank DuMond (1865–1951), American painter and teacher
Henri-Julien Dumont (1859–1921), French painter
Augustus Dunbier (1888–1977), American painter
Brian Dunlop (born 1938), Australian still life and figurative painter
Anne Dunn (born 1929), English artist and draftsman
Elizabeth Durack (1915–2000), Australian artist and writer
Asher Brown Durand (1796–1886), American painter
Albrecht Dürer (1471–1528), German painter, print-maker and theorist
Cornelis Dusart (1660–1704), Dutch painter, draftsman and print-maker
Willem Cornelisz Duyster (1599–1678), Dutch painter of military life
Geoffrey Dyer (born 1947), Australian painter
Anthony van Dyck (1599–1641), Flemish/English court painter
Floris van Dyck (1575–1651), Dutch still-life painter
Friedel Dzubas (1915–1994), German/American abstract painter

References
References can be found under each entry.

D